
Gmina Wróblew is a rural gmina (administrative district) in Sieradz County, Łódź Voivodeship, in central Poland.

Villages
Gmina Wróblew contains the villages and settlements of Bliźniew, Charłupia Wielka, Dąbrówka, Drzązna, Dziebędów, Gęsówka, Inczew, Józefów, Kobierzycko, Kościerzyn, Ocin, Oraczew Mały, Oraczew Wielki, Próchna, Rakowice, Rowy, Sadokrzyce, Sędzice, Słomków Mokry, Słomków Suchy, Smardzew, Tubądzin, Tworkowizna Rowska, Wągłczew and Wróblew.

Neighbouring gminas
Gmina Wróblew is bordered by the town of Sieradz and by the gminas of Błaszki, Brąszewice, Brzeźnio, Sieradz and Warta.

References
Polish official population figures 2006

Wroblew
Sieradz County